Azecidae is a family of small and very small air-breathing land snails, terrestrial gastropod mollusks in the superfamily Azecoidea .

Families
 Azeca J. Fleming, 1828
 Cryptazeca de Folin & Bérillon, 1877
 Gomeziella Cianfanelli, Bodon, Giusti & Manganelli, 2018
 Gomphroa Westerlund, 1903
  Hypnocarnica Cianfanelli & Bodon, 2018
 Hypnophila Bourguignat, 1858

References

 Watson, H. (1920). The affinities of Pyramidula, Patulastra, Acanthinula, and Vallonia. Proceedings of the Malacological Society of London, 14 (1): 6-30, pl. 1–2. London
 Bouchet P., Rocroi J.P., Hausdorf B., Kaim A., Kano Y., Nützel A., Parkhaev P., Schrödl M. & Strong E.E. (2017). Revised classification, nomenclator and typification of gastropod and monoplacophoran families. Malacologia. 61(1-2): 1-526

External links

  Manganelli, G., Barbato, D., Pieńkowska, J. R., Benocci, A.; Lesicki, A. & Giusti, F. (2019). Unravelling the tangle of the azecid land snails: a survey on the supraspecific systematics based on comparative morphology and molecular phylogeny (Gastropoda: Eupulmonata: Orthurethra). Folia Malacologica. 27(4): 253-291

Gastropod families
Helicina (suborder)